Sargocentron lepros, the spiny squirrelfish, is a nocturnal species of squirrelfish belonging to the genus of Sargocentron. It inhabits the outer reef slopes of oceanic islands, mostly in the Southern Pacific Ocean. It is normally found solitary.

References

lepros
Fish of the Pacific Ocean
Taxa named by Gerald R. Allen